Plautella is a genus of butterflies in the family Lycaenidae. It is a monotypic genus containing Plautella cossaea found in the Indomalayan realm Malaya, Java, Sumatra and Borneo.

Subspecies
P. c. cossaea (Sumatra)
P. c. hegesias Fruhstorfer, 1910 (Nias)
P. c. pambui Eliot, 1973 (southern Burma, Thailand, Malay Peninsula)
P. c. plauta H.H.Druce, 1895 (Borneo)
P. c. sabatina Fruhstorfer, 1910 (Java, Sumatra)
P. c. sonchus H.H. Druce, 1896 (Borneo, Thailand)

Synonyms 
Acytolepis cossaea cossaea
Acytolepis cossaea sabatina
Acytolepis plauta
Celastrina cossaea pambui Eliot, 1973
Celastrina cossaea sonchus
Celastrina plauta
Cyaniris cossaea distanti Fruhstorfer, 1910
Cyaniris cossaea hegesias Fruhstorfer, 1910
Cyaniris cossaea plauta
Cyaniris cossaea sabatina Fruhstorfer, 1910
Cyaniris cossaea de Nicéville, 1895
Cyaniris plauta H.H. Druce, 1895
Cyaniris sonchus H.H. Druce, 1896
Lycaena cossaea (de Nicéville) Piepers & Snellen, 1918
Lycaenopis cossaea hegesias
Lycaenopsis (Lycaenopsis) sonchus
Lycaenopsis cossaea cossaea
Lycaenopsis cossaea plauta
Lycaenopsis cossaea sabatina
Lycaenopsis plauta
Lycaenopsis sonchus

References

 , 1983. Blue butterflies of the Lycaenopsis group: 1-309, 6 pls. London.
, 1895. On new and little-known butterflies from the Indo-Malayan Region. The Journal of the Bombay Natural History Society 9: 259-321, 4 pls.

Polyommatini
Butterflies of Borneo
Monotypic butterfly genera
Lycaenidae genera